The 1999 Ukrainian Amateur Cup  was the fourth annual season of Ukraine's football knockout competition for amateur football teams. The competition started on 6 September 1999 and concluded on 16 October 1999.

The competition shifted to spring-fall system (within a single calendar year) along with competition in championship.

Teams

Notes:

Eight regions that were represented last season, chose not to participate in the competition among which are such oblasts Chernivtsi, Dnipropetrovsk, Kirovohrad, Mykolaiv, Vinnytsia, Zakarpattia, Zaporizhia, and Zhytomyr.

Competition schedule

First qualification round

Quarterfinals (1/4)

Semifinals (1/2)

Final

See also
1999 Ukrainian Football Amateur League
1999–2000 Ukrainian Cup

External links
 1999 Ukrainian Amateur Cup at Ukrainian football from Oleksiy Kobozyev

Ukrainian Amateur Cup
Ukrainian Amateur Cup
Amateur Cup